The Las Vacas River is a river in Guatemala. It begins in the mountains in the eastern outskirts of Guatemala City and runs in a north-easterly direction to join the Motagua River where the departmental borders of El Progreso, Baja Verapaz and Guatemala converge. In its final kilometres the river marks the limits between the departments of Guatemala and El Progreso.

The river is a major outlet for Guatemala City's raw sewage. Its highly polluted waters contain little aquatic life, and contribute to the pollution of the Motagua river and the marine ecosystem in the Gulf of Honduras.

References

Las Vacas